Ansuz is the conventional name given to the a-rune of the Elder Futhark, .
The name is based on Proto-Germanic *ansuz, denoting a deity belonging to the principal pantheon in Germanic paganism.

Name
In the Norwegian rune poem, óss is given a meaning of "estuary" while in the Anglo-Saxon one,   takes the Latin meaning of "mouth". The Younger Futhark rune is transliterated as ą to distinguish it from the new ár rune (ᛅ), which continues the jēran rune after loss of prevocalic *j- in Proto-Norse *jár (Old Saxon ).

Development in Anglo-Saxon runes

The Anglo-Saxon futhorc split the Elder Futhark a rune into three independent runes due to the development of the vowel system in Anglo-Frisian.

Development in Younger Futhark

It is transliterated as ą. This represented the phoneme /ɑ̃/, and sometimes /æ/ (also written ) and /o/ (also written ).
The variant grapheme  became independent as representing the phoneme /ø/ during the 11th to 14th centuries.

Rune poems
It is mentioned in all three rune poems:

References

Runes